Zahrib is a former village in central Slovenia in the Municipality of Zagorje ob Savi. It is now part of the village of Mlinše. It is part of the traditional region of Upper Carniola and is now included in the Central Sava Statistical Region.

Geography

Zahrib stands on a hill northeast of Mlinše. It is connected to Mlinše by a gravel road that regularly washes out after storms and becomes impassable.

History
Zahrib had a population of 15 (in four houses) in 1880, and 16 (in three houses) in 1900. Zahrib was annexed by Briše in 1953, ending its existence as a separate settlement. It is now part of Mlinše, which was also a hamlet of Briše until 1953.

References

External links

Zahrib on Geopedia

Populated places in the Municipality of Zagorje ob Savi
Former settlements in Slovenia